The 1981–82 NBA season was the 76ers 33rd season in the NBA and 19th season in Philadelphia. They would finish with a record of 58–24.

In the playoffs, the Sixers swept the Atlanta Hawks in two games in the First Round, and defeated the Milwaukee Bucks in six games in the Semifinals to face off against the defending NBA champion Boston Celtics in the Conference Finals.

In the Eastern Conference Finals, the Sixers defeated the Celtics in seven games to earn a trip to the NBA Finals for the 3rd time in 6 years. In the NBA Finals, the Sixers faced off against the Los Angeles Lakers in a rematch of the 1980 NBA Finals, where the Lakers won in six games. In the deciding 7th game, with under a minute and a Sixers victory well secured, the fans at the Boston Garden chanted "Beat LA" to the Sixers, one of pro basketballs most enduring moments, wanting the team to defeat the Lakers in the NBA Finals, as Celtics fans hated the Lakers. However, the Lakers would go on to win in the NBA Finals, defeating the Sixers in six games to capture their second NBA championship in the 1980s. The Lakers won game one by going on an incredible 40-9 scoring spurt in the second half. The home team would win each of the remaining five contests.

Draft picks

Roster

Regular season

Season standings

Record vs. opponents

Game log

Regular season

|- align="center" bgcolor="#ccffcc"
| 1
|- align="center" bgcolor="#ccffcc"
| 2
| October 31
| @ Atlanta
| W 108–106
|
|
|
| The Omni
| 2–0

|- align="center" bgcolor="#ccffcc"
| 3
| November 3
| @ Washington
| W 112–99
|
|
|
| Capital Centre
| 3–0
|- align="center" bgcolor="#ccffcc"
| 4
| November 4
| Indiana
| W 107–99
|
|
|
| The Spectrum
| 4–0
|- align="center" bgcolor="#ffcccc"
| 5
| November 6
| Atlanta
| L 99–106
|
|
|
| The Spectrum
| 4–1
|- align="center" bgcolor="#ccffcc"
| 6
| November 10
| @ Detroit
| W 95–93
|
|
|
| Pontiac Silverdome
| 5–1
|- align="center" bgcolor="#ccffcc"
| 10
| November 18
| Milwaukee
| W 102–100
|
|
|
| The Spectrum
| 9–1
|- align="center" bgcolor="#ccffcc"
| 12
| November 21
| Houston
| W 135–106
|
|
|
| The Spectrum
| 11–1
|- align="center" bgcolor="#ccffcc"
| 13
| November 27
| @ Indiana
| W 124–112 (OT)
|
|
|
| Market Square Arena
| 12–1
|- align="center" bgcolor="#ccffcc"
| 14
| November 28
| Detroit
| W 116–103
|
|
|
| The Spectrum
| 13–1

|- align="center" bgcolor="#ccffcc"
| 15
| December 1
| @ Atlanta
| W 107–98
|
|
|
| The Omni
| 14–1
|- align="center" bgcolor="#ffcccc"
| 16
| December 2
| San Antonio
| L 101–106
|
|
|
| The Spectrum
| 14–2
|- align="center" bgcolor="#ffcccc"
| 17
| December 4
| @ Boston
| L 103–111
|
|
|
| Boston Garden
| 14–3
|- align="center" bgcolor="#ccffcc"
| 18
| December 5
| @ New Jersey
| W 109–102
|
|
|
| Brendan Byrne Arena
| 15–3
|- align="center" bgcolor="#ccffcc"
| 19
| December 9
| Denver
| W 137–109
|
|
|
| The Spectrum
| 16–3
|- align="center" bgcolor="#ffcccc"
| 22
| December 13
| @ Milwaukee
| L 108–127
|
|
|
| The MECCA
| 18–4
|- align="center" bgcolor="#ccffcc"
| 24
| December 19
| Boston
| W 123–118 (OT)
|
|
|
| The Spectrum
| 19–5
|- align="center" bgcolor="#ffcccc"
| 26
| December 27
| @ Phoenix
| L 96–99
|
|
|
| Arizona Veterans Memorial Coliseum
| 20–6
|- align="center" bgcolor="#ccffcc"
| 27
| December 29
| @ Golden State
| W 142–135
|
|
|
| Oakland–Alameda County Coliseum
| 21–6
|- align="center" bgcolor="#ccffcc"
| 28
| December 30
| @ Seattle
| W 102–99
|
|
|
| Kingdome
| 22–6

|- align="center" bgcolor="#ccffcc"
| 29
| January 1
| @ Portland
| W 120–105
|
|
|
| Memorial Coliseum
| 23–6
|- align="center" bgcolor="#ffcccc"
| 31
| January 5
| @ Detroit
| L 101–124
|
|
|
| Pontiac Silverdome
| 24–7
|- align="center" bgcolor="#ccffcc"
| 32
| January 6
| Washington
| W 126–112
|
|
|
| The Spectrum
| 25–7
|- align="center" bgcolor="#ffcccc"
| 33
| January 8
| @ Boston
| L 90–96
|
|
|
| Boston Garden
| 25–8
|- align="center" bgcolor="#ffcccc"
| 34
| January 9
| New Jersey
| L 113–120
|
|
|
| The Spectrum
| 25–9
|- align="center" bgcolor="#ccffcc"
| 35
| January 12
| @ Washington
| W 95–92
|
|
|
| Capital Centre
| 26–9
|- align="center" bgcolor="#ffcccc"
| 36
| January 13
| Milwaukee
| L 107–111
|
|
|
| The Spectrum
| 26–10
|- align="center" bgcolor="#ffcccc"
| 37
| January 15
| Atlanta
| L 90–96
|
|
|
| The Spectrum
| 26–11
|- align="center" bgcolor="#ffcccc"
| 38
| January 17
| @ New Jersey
| L 97–105
|
|
|
| Brendan Byrne Arena
| 26–12
|- align="center" bgcolor="#ccffcc"
| 39
| January 20
| Portland
| W 115–110
|
|
|
| The Spectrum
| 27–12
|- align="center" bgcolor="#ccffcc"
| 40
| January 22
| @ Indiana
| W 112–105
|
|
|
| Market Square Arena
| 28–12
|- align="center" bgcolor="#ccffcc"
| 41
| January 23
| Seattle
| W 100–87
|
|
|
| The Spectrum
| 29–12
|- align="center" bgcolor="#ffcccc"
| 42
| January 26
| @ San Antonio
| L 95–103
|
|
|
| HemisFair Arena
| 29–13
|- align="center" bgcolor="#ffcccc"
| 44
| January 28
| @ Houston
| L 101–109
|
|
|
| The Summit
| 30–14

|- align="center" bgcolor="#ccffcc"
| 45
| February 3
| Washington
| W 122–96
|
|
|
| The Spectrum
| 31–14
|- align="center" bgcolor="#ccffcc"
| 46
| February 5
| New Jersey
| W 116–112
|
|
|
| The Spectrum
| 32–14
|- align="center" bgcolor="#ccffcc"
| 48
| February 10
| Indiana
| W 102–96
|
|
|
| The Spectrum
| 34–14
|- align="center" bgcolor="#ccffcc"
| 53
| February 21
| Phoenix
| W 109–102
|
|
|
| The Spectrum
| 39–14
|- align="center" bgcolor="#ffcccc"
| 55
| February 26
| @ Los Angeles
| L 114–116 (2OT)
|
|
|
| The Forum
| 40–15
|- align="center" bgcolor="#ffcccc"
| 56
| February 27
| @ Denver
| L 125–134
|
|
|
| McNichols Sports Arena
| 40–16

|- align="center" bgcolor="#ccffcc"
| 59
| March 5
| Atlanta
| W 89–80
|
|
|
| The Spectrum
| 42–17
|- align="center" bgcolor="#ccffcc"
| 60
| March 7
| Los Angeles
| W 119–113
|
|
|
| The Spectrum
| 43–17
|- align="center" bgcolor="#ccffcc"
| 61
| March 10
| Golden State
| W 134–114
|
|
|
| The Spectrum
| 44–17
|- align="center" bgcolor="#ffcccc"
| 63
| March 16
| @ Milwaukee
| L 91–106
|
|
|
| The MECCA
| 45–18
|- align="center" bgcolor="#ccffcc"
| 64
| March 17
| Washington
| W 102–93
|
|
|
| The Spectrum
| 46–18
|- align="center" bgcolor="#ccffcc"
| 65
| March 19
| Indiana
| W 112–95
|
|
|
| The Spectrum
| 47–18
|- align="center" bgcolor="#ffcccc"
| 66
| March 21
| Boston
| L 111–123
|
|
|
| The Spectrum
| 47–19
|- align="center" bgcolor="#ffcccc"
| 67
| March 24
| New Jersey
| L 106–111
|
|
|
| The Spectrum
| 47–20
|- align="center" bgcolor="#ffcccc"
| 68
| March 25
| @ Detroit
| L 98–100
|
|
|
| Pontiac Silverdome
| 47–21
|- align="center" bgcolor="#ccffcc"
| 70
| March 28
| @ Boston
| W 116–98
|
|
|
| Boston Garden
| 49–21
|- align="center" bgcolor="#ffcccc"
| 71
| March 30
| @ Milwaukee
| L 114–116 (OT)
|
|
|
| The MECCA
| 49–22

|- align="center" bgcolor="#ccffcc"
| 76
| April 7
| @ New Jersey
| W 116–113
|
|
|
| Brendan Byrne Arena
| 53–23
|- align="center" bgcolor="#ffcccc"
| 77
| April 9
| @ Atlanta
| L 88–103
|
|
|
| The Omni
| 54–23
|- align="center" bgcolor="#ffcccc"
| 78
| April 11
| Boston
| L 109–110 (OT)
|
|
|
| The Spectrum
| 54–24
|- align="center" bgcolor="#ccffcc"
| 79
| April 13
| @ Indiana
| W 93–89
|
|
|
| Market Square Arena
| 55–24
|- align="center" bgcolor="#ccffcc"
| 80
| April 14
| Detroit
| W 119–111
|
|
|
| The Spectrum
| 56–24
|- align="center" bgcolor="#ccffcc"
| 81
| April 16
| @ Washington
| W 100–96
|
|
|
| Capital Centre
| 57–24
|- align="center" bgcolor="#ccffcc"
| 82
| April 18
| Milwaukee
| W 110–86
|
|
|
| The Spectrum
| 58–24

Playoffs

|- align="center" bgcolor="#ccffcc"
| 1
| April 21
| Atlanta
| W 111–76
| Darryl Dawkins (27)
| Darryl Dawkins (9)
| Maurice Cheeks (6)
| Spectrum11,250
| 1–0
|- align="center" bgcolor="#ccffcc"
| 2
| April 23
| @ Atlanta
| W 98–95 (OT)
| Julius Erving (28)
| Dawkins, C. Jones (8)
| Julius Erving (6)
| Omni Coliseum8,703
| 2–0
|-

|- align="center" bgcolor="#ccffcc"
| 1
| April 25
| Milwaukee
| W 125–122
| Julius Erving (34)
| Caldwell Jones (16)
| Maurice Cheeks (10)
| Spectrum10,086
| 1–0
|- align="center" bgcolor="#ccffcc"
| 2
| April 28
| Milwaukee
| W 120–108
| Andrew Toney (31)
| Caldwell Jones (9)
| Maurice Cheeks (8)
| Spectrum14,716
| 2–0
|- align="center" bgcolor="#ffcccc"
| 3
| May 1
| @ Milwaukee
| L 91–92
| Maurice Cheeks (19)
| Caldwell Jones (6)
| Maurice Cheeks (8)
| MECCA Arena11,052
| 2–1
|- align="center" bgcolor="#ccffcc"
| 4
| May 2
| @ Milwaukee
| W 100–93
| Julius Erving (21)
| Julius Erving (11)
| Julius Erving (9)
| MECCA Arena11,052
| 3–1
|- align="center" bgcolor="#ffcccc"
| 5
| May 5
| Milwaukee
| L 98–110
| Julius Erving (28)
| Julius Erving (10)
| Maurice Cheeks (9)
| Spectrum16,668
| 3–2
|- align="center" bgcolor="#ccffcc"
| 6
| May 7
| @ Milwaukee
| W 102–90
| Maurice Cheeks (26)
| Caldwell Jones (12)
| Julius Erving (7)
| MECCA Arena11,052
| 4–2
|-

|- align="center" bgcolor="#ffcccc"
| 1
| May 9
| @ Boston
| L 81–121
| Andrew Toney (15)
| four players tied (7)
| Andrew Toney (4)
| Boston Garden15,320
| 0–1
|- align="center" bgcolor="#ccffcc"
| 2
| May 12
| @ Boston
| W 121–113
| Andrew Toney (30)
| Caldwell Jones (11)
| Maurice Cheeks (14)
| Boston Garden15,320
| 1–1
|- align="center" bgcolor="#ccffcc"
| 3
| May 15
| Boston
| W 99–97
| Julius Erving (19)
| Caldwell Jones (12)
| Maurice Cheeks (10)
| Spectrum18,364
| 2–1
|- align="center" bgcolor="#ccffcc"
| 4
| May 16
| Boston
| W 119–94
| Andrew Toney (39)
| Caldwell Jones (11)
| Maurice Cheeks (11)
| Spectrum18,364
| 3–1
|- align="center" bgcolor="#ffcccc"
| 5
| May 19
| @ Boston
| L 85–114
| Andrew Toney (18)
| Darryl Dawkins (10)
| Lionel Hollins (7)
| Boston Garden15,320
| 3–2
|- align="center" bgcolor="#ffcccc"
| 6
| May 21
| Boston
| L 75–88
| Julius Erving (24)
| Caldwell Jones (17)
| Maurice Cheeks (7)
| Spectrum18,364
| 3–3
|- align="center" bgcolor="#ccffcc"
| 7
| May 23
| @ Boston
| W 120–106
| Andrew Toney (34)
| Caldwell Jones (10)
| Maurice Cheeks (11)
| Boston Garden15,320
| 4–3
|-

|- align="center" bgcolor="#ffcccc"
| 1
| May 27
| Los Angeles
| L 117–124
| Julius Erving (27)
| Caldwell Jones (11)
| Cheeks, Toney (9)
| Spectrum18,364
| 0–1
|- align="center" bgcolor="#ccffcc"
| 2
| May 30
| Los Angeles
| W 110–94
| Julius Erving (24)
| Julius Erving (14)
| Andrew Toney (11)
| Spectrum18,364
| 1–1
|- align="center" bgcolor="#ffcccc"
| 3
| June 1
| @ Los Angeles
| L 108–129
| Andrew Toney (36)
| Darryl Dawkins (13)
| Maurice Cheeks (9)
| The Forum17,505
| 1–2
|- align="center" bgcolor="#ffcccc"
| 4
| June 3
| @ Los Angeles
| L 101–111
| Andrew Toney (28)
| Bobby Jones (9)
| Andrew Toney (11)
| The Forum17,505
| 1–3
|- align="center" bgcolor="#ccffcc"
| 5
| June 6
| Los Angeles
| W 135–102
| Andrew Toney (31)
| Julius Erving (12)
| Toney, Cheeks (8)
| Spectrum18,364
| 2–3
|- align="center" bgcolor="#ffcccc"
| 6
| June 8
| @ Los Angeles
| L 104–114
| Julius Erving (30)
| Caldwell Jones (9)
| Maurice Cheeks (9)
| The Forum17,505
| 2–4
|-

Awards and records
 Julius Erving, All-NBA First Team
 Bobby Jones, NBA All-Defensive First Team
 Caldwell Jones, NBA All-Defensive First Team

References

 Philadelphia 76ers on Basketball Reference

Philadelphia
Philadelphia 76ers seasons
Eastern Conference (NBA) championship seasons
Philadelphia
Philadelphia